Aleksandr Vladimirovich Kisly (born 7 January 1974) is a former Russian football player.

References

1974 births
Living people
Russian footballers
FC Okean Nakhodka players
Russian Premier League players

Association football forwards